North Warnborough is a village in the Hart district of Hampshire, England. It is in the civil parish of Odiham. The Basingstoke Canal passes through the village, and the River Whitewater flows to the north.

History
Held by King Harold before the Norman invasion of 1066, North Warnborough and Odiham had become a royal burgh by 1086. Half-way between Winchester and Windsor, the Saxon kings maintained a palace and lodgings in Odiham. The village once had two mills, with eight water mills recorded in the Odiham Hundred, as well as seven pubs.

Description
North Warnborough consists of a conservation area, bounded by Mill Corner in the north and The Street in the south, lying to each side of the B3349 Reading to Alton road. The village's 40 listed buildings lie within the conservation area. There are also later housing developments with post-war housing beyond the southern boundary of the conservation area to the Odiham boundary and also in the Old Orchard. A detailed character appraisal was published by Hart District Council in 2009. 

North of the canal lies North Warnborough Green, another SSSI, including a ford.

The Lord Derby and The Anchor pubs remain. The Swan was destroyed by fire in September 2010 and the Jolly Miller is now pending change of use following a short period as 'The Chilli Pad' Thai restaurant. The Millhouse is a family restaurant.

References

External links

Villages in Hampshire
Odiham